Agah is a Turkish masculine name. It is also used as a surname. Notable people with the name are as follows:

Given name
Agah Efendi (1832–1885), Ottoman civil servant
Agah Oktay Güner (born 1937), Turkish journalist and politician
Agah Pasha (birth of date unknown–1855), Ottoman politician

Surname
Ahmet Âgâh, known as Yahya Kemal Beyatlı (1884 – 1 November 1958), Turkish poet and politician
Salman Agah (born 1972), American skateboarder

Turkish masculine given names
Surnames from given names